The 2017–18 George Mason Patriots women's basketball team represents George Mason University during the 2017–18 NCAA Division I women's basketball season. The Patriots, led by fifth year head coach Nyla Milleson, play their home games at EagleBank Arena and were members of the Atlantic 10 Conference. They finished the season 24–10, 11–5 in A-10 play to finish in fourth place. They advanced to the quarterfinals of the A-10 women's tournament where they lost to George Washington. They received an at-large bid to the Women's National Invitation Tournament where they defeated Stephen F. Austin in the first round before losing to Virginia Tech in the second round.

Media

George Mason Patriots Sports Network
Patriots games will be broadcast on WGMU Radio and streamed online through Patriot Vision . Most home games will also be featured on the A-10 Digital Network. Select games will be televised.

Roster

Schedule

|-
!colspan=9 style="background:#; color:white;"| Non-conference regular season

|-
!colspan=9 style="background:#; color:white;"| Atlantic 10 regular season

|-
!colspan=9 style="background:#; color:white;"| Atlantic 10 Women's Tournament

|-
!colspan=9 style="background:#; color:white;"| WNIT

Rankings
2017–18 NCAA Division I women's basketball rankings

See also
 2017–18 George Mason Patriots men's basketball team

References

George Mason Patriots women's basketball seasons
George Mason
George Mason Patriots women's basketball
George Mason Patriots women's basketball
George Mason